Clyde Gilmour,  (8 June 1912 in Calgary – 7 November 1997 in Toronto) was a Canadian broadcaster and print journalist, mostly known for his half-century career with CBC Radio.

Early life and education
Gilmour was raised in Medicine Hat, Alberta, where he attended Alexandra High School until graduation in 1929. The conditions of the Great Depression prevented Gilmour from continuing to university.

Career
In 1930 Gilmour joined the Medicine Hat News staff.  He served as a war correspondent and in public relations during World War II, and held the rank of lieutenant. He then moved to Vancouver, where he wrote film and music reviews for the Vancouver Province and Vancouver Sun newspapers, including a review in 1950 of some early Oscar Peterson recordings. He broadcast film reviews on station for CBC Radio on CBU.

In 1954, Gilmour moved to Toronto and wrote similar columns for the Toronto Telegram until that newspaper's demise in 1971. He later wrote for the Toronto Star as a film critic for the remainder of the 1970s. On 5 October 1956, he broadcast the first episode of Gilmour's Albums on CBC Radio, a weekly music programme which continued for more than 40 years until 14 June 1997.

Selections on the programme were generally drawn from his personal collection which eventually included 10,000 vinyl records and 4000 Compact Discs. These items were bequeathed to the CBC and today form the Clyde Gilmour Collection. Gilmour's Albums established a record longevity for single-host CBC Radio shows.

Gilmour was appointed a Member of the Order of Canada in 1975. He died at St. Joseph's Health Centre, Toronto, on 7 November 1997, aged 85. The Toronto Film Critics Association occasionally presents the Clyde Gilmour Award in his honour; created in 1997, Gilmour himself was posthumously honoured as the award's first recipient.

Career timeline
 1930–1936: Medicine Hat News, newspaper columnist and reporter
 1936–1942: Edmonton Journal
  1939–1945 World War II: Navy News writer, wartime public relations
 1945–1949: Vancouver Province
 1947–1964: CBC Radio, film reviewer
 1949–1952: Mayfair, music columnist
 1949–1954: Vancouver Sun, film reviewer
 1950–1964: Maclean's, film reviewer
 1953–1955: Window On Canada, CBC Television, host
 1954–1971: Toronto Telegram, film reviewer
 1956–1997: Gilmour's Albums, CBC Radio
 1958–1959: Folio, CBC Television
 1971–1980: Toronto Star, film reviewer
 1977–1983: Audio Canada, magazine writer
 1980–1983: Toronto Star, features
 1983–1985: Leisure Ways

Awards and recognition
 1975: Member, Order of Canada
 1976: Honorary Doctor of Laws from McMaster University
 1990: Canadian News Hall of Fame

References

External links
Order of Canada citation
The Canadian Encyclopedia: Clyde Gilmour
CBC Archives: Virtual Tour – Other Libraries (information on Clyde Gilmour Collection)

1912 births
1997 deaths
Canadian film critics
CBC Radio hosts
CBC Television people
Canadian male journalists
Canadian newspaper journalists
Members of the Order of Canada
People from Calgary
People from Medicine Hat
Journalists from Alberta